Imoco Volley is an Italian women's volleyball club based in Conegliano and currently playing in the Serie A1.

History

The club was founded on 15 March 2012, two months after the bankruptcy of  the other volleyball team in Conegliano. It has been playing under the name  since its foundation in 2012.

The club won the Serie A1 for the first time in 2015–16, winning the Italian Super Cup a few months later on 8 December 2016.

On 5 March 2017, the club won the Coppa Italia for the first time after beating Liu Jo Nordmeccanica Modena 3–0 in the final.

In December 2019 the club won the Women's Club World Championship.

In 2020, the Imoco Volley won its second Coppa Italia. Due to the coronavirus pandemic, both the Serie A1 and the CEV Champions League were untimely cancelled. The Imoco Volley, with its new name A. Carraro Imoco Conegliano, reached, along with the VakıfBank, the semi-finals of the CEV Champions League after winning all its matches, but it could not play them; it was declared winner of the regular season of the Serie A1, but no team was declared winner of the 2019-20 Italian championship. It ended the 2019–20 season by winning three of its five goals: the Italian Supercup, the Women's Club World Championship in Shaoxing and the Coppa Italia.

All the starting seven of the club decided to renew their contracts for the 2020–21 season, after their wins in the previous season and the cancellation of the finals of the Serie A1 and the CEV Champions League (the only major title never won by the club). More than half of the current players of the Imoco Volley are part of the starting seven of the Italian national team, runner-up at the 2018 World Championship. The others are champions such as the Dutch Robin de Kruijf, the Polish setter Joanna Wołosz and the American Kimberly Hill. The club renewed all the other players excepting Giulia Gennari, according to its policy to have many young new talents along with top players of the volleyball. The new team has three players who are under the age of 20 years, one has less than 18 years, the Italian Loveth Omoruyi. Sarah Fahr, who is not part of the starting roster, has already won a silver medal at the 2018 World Championship and a bronze medal at the 2019 European Championship with the Italian national team.

Previous names

Team

All Roster player's of last Season ⤴

Season 2022–2023

Current coaching staff

Head Coaches

Team Captains

Kit providers
The table below shows the history of kit providers for the Imoco Volley.

Stadium and locations

Position Main

Honours

International competitions
  FIVB Volleyball Women's Club World Championship
 Winners (2): 2019, 2022
  Women's CEV Champions League
 Winners (1): 2021

Domestic competitions
  Serie A1
 Winners (5): 2015–16, 2017–18, 2018–19, 2020–21, 2021–22
  Italian Cup
 Winners (5): 2016–17, 2019–20, 2020–21, 2021–22, 2022–23  
  Italian Supercup
 Winners (6): 2016, 2018, 2019, 2020, 2021, 2022

Notable players

Domestic players

 Giulia Agostinetto (2012–2013)
 Ilaria Maruotti (2012–2013)
 Valentina Fiorin (2012–2015)
 Carlotta Daminato (2012–2014)
 Letizia Camera (2012–2013)
 Carlotta Zanotto (2012–2013)
 Carla Rossetto (2012–2013)
 Raffaella Calloni (2012–2014)
 Alessandra Crozzolin (2012–2013)
 Cristina Barcellini (2012–2015)
 Jenny Barazza (2012–2017)
 Melissa Donà (2013–2014)
 Alice Scodellaro (2013–2014)
 Marta Bechis (2013–2014, 2015–2016, 2017–2019) 
 Valentina Tirozzi (2013–2014, 2018–2019)
 Sofia Arimattei (2014–2015)
 Martina Boscoscuro (2014–2015)
 Anna Nicoletti (2014–2016, 2017–2018)
 Valentina Serena (2015–2016)
 Serena Ortolani (2015–2017)
 Alice Santini (2015–2016)
 Valentina Arrighetti (2015–2016)
 Lucia Crisanti (2015–2016)
 Chiara De Bortoli (2015–2016)
 Ofelia Malinov (2016–2017)
 Elisa Cella (2016–2018)
 Raphaela Folie (2016–2022)
 Silvia Fiori (2016–2018)
 Anna Danesi (2016–2019)
 Carolina Costagrande (2016–2017)
 Laura Melandri (2017–2018)
 Eleonora Fersino (2018–2020)
 Miriam Sylla (2018–2022)
 Gaia Moretto (2018–2019)
 Indre Sorokaite (2019–2020)
 Alexandra Botezat (2019–2020)
 Terry Enweonwu (2019–2020)
 Margherita Brandi (2019–2020)
 Giulia Gennari (2019–2022)
 Paola Egonu (2019–2022)
 Katja Eckl (2020–2021)
 Gaia Natalizia (2020–2021)
 Lara Caravello (2020–2022)
 Loveth Omoruyi (2020–2022)
 Giorgia Frosini (2021–2022)
 Alessia Gennari (2022–)
 Roberta Carraro (2022–)
 Federica Squarcini (2022–)
 Marina Lubian (2022–)
 Eleonora Furlan (2014–2015, 2022–)
 Sarah Fahr (2020–)
 Ylenia Pericati (2022–)
 Monica De Gennaro (2013–)

European Players

 Emiliya Nikolova (2012–2015)
 Hristina Vuchkova (2021–2022)

 Marina Katić (2014–2015)
 Samanta Fabris (2017–2019)
 Martina Šamadan (2018–2019)

 Lucille Gicquel (2020–2021)

 Berit Kauffeldt (2013–2014) 
 Jennifer Janiska (2019–2020)

 Robin de Kruijf (2016–)

 Anthí Vasilantonáki (2014–2016)
 Athina Papafotiou (2017–2018)

 Zuzanna Efimienko-Młotkowska (2012–2013)
 Berenika Tomsia (2016–2017)
 Katarzyna Skorupa (2016–2017)
 Joanna Wołosz (2017–)

 Jovana Brakočević-Canzian (2015–2016)

 Isabelle Haak (2022–)

 Neriman Özsoy (2014–2015)

Non-European Players

 Elina Maria Rodríguez (2018–2019)

 Alexa Gray (2022–)

 Miyu Nagaoka (2018–2019)

 Carli Lloyd (2013–2014)
 Lauren Gibbemeyer (2013–2014)
 Alisha Glass-Childress (2014–2016)
 Rachael Adams (2014–2016)
 Micha Hancock (2014–2015)
 Megan Easy (2015–2016, 2017–2019)
 Nicole Fawcett (2016–2017)
 Kimberly Hill (2017–2021)
 Karsta Lowe (2018–2019)
 Chiaka Ogbogu (2019–2020)
 McKenzie Adams (2020–2021)
 Megan Courtney-Lush (2021–2022)
 Kathryn Plummer (2021–)
 Kelsey Robinson-Cook (2015–2017, 2022–)

Players written in italic still play for the club.

See also
 Roster Imoco Volley Past Squads
 Italian Women's Volleyball League
 Italy women's national volleyball team
 CEV Women's Champions League
 Prosecco

References

External links

 Official website 
 Serie A website 
 
 
 
 
 Imoco volley on Volleybox.net
Imoco Volley on Volleyballworld.com

Italian women's volleyball clubs
Volleyball clubs established in 2012
2012 establishments in Italy
Sport in Veneto
Serie A1 (women's volleyball) clubs